Köseler is a village in the Yığılca District of Düzce Province in Turkey. Its population is 115 (2022).

References

Villages in Yığılca District